Acer sino-oblongum, the south China maple, is a species of evergreen maple tree native to China's Guangdong Province and Hong Kong.

Acer sino-oblongum is a short tree up to 7 meters tall. The leaves are elliptical and waxy, unlobed and untoothed unlike the multi-lobed leaves found on most maples. The tree occurs naturally in coastal evergreen forests.

References

External links
line drawing for Flora of China, figure 571, drawing 3 at right

sino-oblongum
Trees of Hong Kong
Flora of Guangdong
Plants described in 1932